Paul J. Wojno (born March 30, 1956) is a Democratic member of the Michigan Senate  since 2019, where he currently represents the 10th district.

Early life 
Wojno was born to parents Florence and Henry Wojno on March 30, 1956 in Detroit, Wayne County, Michigan. Later, Wojno moved to Center Line, Macomb County, Michigan.

Personal life 
Wojno's wife is Lisa Wojno, who is a former state representative. They have three children, Kennedy, Bradley, and Audrey. Wojno is a member of the Knights of Columbus and the American Cancer Society. Wojno is Roman Catholic.

Political career 
Wojno served as a member of the Michigan House of Representatives for the 28th district from 1997 to 2002. He was succeeded by his wife, Lisa. He started serving in the Michigan Senate in 2019.

References

External links 
 Official Website

Living people
1956 births
Catholics from Michigan
Spouses of Michigan politicians
Wayne State University alumni
Democratic Party members of the Michigan House of Representatives
Democratic Party Michigan state senators
20th-century American politicians
21st-century American politicians
Politicians from Detroit
People from Warren, Michigan